William Armistead Christian Jr. (born 1944) is an American religious historian and independent scholar. He was the J.E. and Lillian Byrne Tipton Distinguished Visiting Professor in Religious Studies at University of California, Santa Barbara. Christian is a graduate of the University of Michigan (PhD 1971).

Awards
 1986 MacArthur Fellows Program

Works
Moving crucifixes in modern Spain, Princeton University Press, 1992
Visionaries: The Spanish Republic and the Reign of Christ, University of California Press, 1996, 
Local religion in sixteenth-century Spain, reprint, Princeton University Press, 1989, 
Apparitions in late Medieval and Renaissance Spain, Princeton University Press, 1981,   (reprint, Princeton University Press, 1989)
Person and God in a Spanish Valley, Seminar Press, 1972,   (reprint Princeton University Press, 1989)
Divided island: faction and unity on Saint Pierre, Harvard University Press, 1969
Religiosidad local en la España de Felipe II], Translators Javier Calzada, José Luis Gil Aristu, Editorial NEREA, 1991, 
La Fiesta en el mundo hispánico, Editors Palma Martínez-Burgos García, Alfredo Rodríguez González, Univ de Castilla La Mancha, 2004, 
Divine Presence in Spain and Western Europe 1500-1960, The Natalie Zemon Davis Annual Lectures, Central European University Press, 2012, 
The Stranger, the Tears, the Photograph, the Touch; Divine Presence in Spain and Europe since 1500, Central European University Press, 2017,

References

American historians of religion
University of California, Santa Barbara faculty
MacArthur Fellows
Living people
University of Michigan alumni
1944 births
Harvard University alumni